A kalesa or calesa is a two-wheeled horse-drawn carriage used in the Philippines. It is commonly vividly painted and decorated. It was a primary mode of public and private transportation during the Spanish colonial era of the Philippines, though in modern times, they largely only survive as tourist attractions.

History

Kalesa (from the Spanish word calesa) were first introduced to the Philippines in the 1700s by the Spanish. It became the major public and private form of transport in the Philippines up until the early 20th century. It was also used to transport goods. They were manufactured by traditional workshops known as karoserya.

Use of the kalesa declined in the mid-20th century, when mass public transportation was largely taken over by motorized jeepneys and tricycles. Pressure to phase out kalesas began in the 1940s when the 7000 or so kalesas still operating in Manila started holding up motorized traffic. Kalesa in modern times are largely only used as tourist attractions. They are still preserved in some areas of the Philippines, such as in San Fernando, Pampanga, Vigan and Laoag. Kalesas can also be found in Intramuros, where they cater to tourists and Binondo in Manila, as well as in Iligan, where decorated kalesas can be taken for a ride along a specific street. In Cagayan, kalesas are common, especially in Tuao, Tuguegarao, and other municipalities of the province.

The colorful decorations of the kalesa was also inherited by the post-World War II jeepney (which were known as "auto calesa" from the 1910s to the 1940s). The legacy of the kalesa is also evident in the horse hood ornament of most jeepneys.

Description 

The kalesa looks like a two-wheeled inclined cart, and is drawn by a single horse. It is made from wood, metal, or a combination of both. Traditionally it had a single forward-facing bench that can accommodate two passengers. The kalesa driver commonly called as kutsero (Spanish cochero) sits on the driver's seat in front. Both the driver and the passengers are enclosed by a canopy originating from the back of the cab. 

American colonial-era kalesas with two side-facing benches (each able to fit two passengers) are known as tartanilla. In modern versions, they can seat eight to ten people. They remain an iconic form of transport in Cebu City.

Large four-wheeled versions of the kalesa were known as karwahe (Spanish carruaje); while drays drawn by carabao (usually used to transport cargo) were known as garetas or kareton (Spanish carretón).

Kalesa had specific terminology for drivers. When a kutsero wants the horse to turn right, he says "mano” while he says "silla” to make the horse turn left.

In popular culture
Composer Ambrosio Del Rosario composed the original music and National Artist of the Philippines Levi Celério wrote the lyrics for a song entitled Kalesa, in honour of the vehicle.

An annual Kalesa Parade is held during the Binatbatan Festival of the Arts of Vigan City.

Gallery

See also
Motorized tricycle (Philippines) 
Jeepney

References 

Road transportation in the Philippines
Tagalog words and phrases
Transportation in Manila